The 1948 Iowa gubernatorial election was held on November 2, 1948. Republican nominee William S. Beardsley defeated Democratic nominee Carroll O. Switzer with 55.68% of the vote.

Primary elections
Primary elections were held on June 7, 1948.

Democratic primary

Candidates
Carroll O. Switzer, Polk County Attorney

Results

Republican primary

Candidates
William S. Beardsley, State Representative
Robert D. Blue, incumbent Governor

Results

General election

Candidates
Major party candidates
William S. Beardsley, Republican
Carroll O. Switzer, Democratic 

Other candidates
C. E. Bierderman, Progressive
Marvin Galbreath, Prohibition
William F. Leonard, Socialist

Results

References

1948
Iowa
Gubernatorial